Tjukurla is an Aboriginal community, located in the Goldfields-Esperance region of Western Australia, within the Shire of Ngaanyatjarraku.

History 
In the early 1980s a bore was put down near the present Tjukurla Community as part of the outstation movement from Docker River community. In mid-1981 an outstation was established at Kintore which provided an opportunity for those living at Papunya to move west, closer to their traditional lands.  From Kintore many people moved to Tjukurla as that community's infrastructure developed. Residents also came from Warakurna, Docker River and a few from Warburton.

Native title 
The community is located within the determined Ngaanyatjarra Lands (Part A) (WAD6004/04) native title claim area.

Governance 
The community is managed through its incorporated body, Tjukurla Community Aboriginal Corporation, incorporated under the Aboriginal Councils and Associations Act 1976 on 17 February 1987.

Town planning 

Tjukurla Layout Plan No.1 has been prepared in accordance with State Planning Policy 3.2 Aboriginal Settlements. Layout Plan No.1 is yet to be endorsed by the community.

References

External links 
 Office of the Registrar of Indigenous Corporations
 Native Title Claimant application summary

Shire of Ngaanyatjarraku
Aboriginal communities in Goldfields-Esperance